Kevin Oh (Hangul: 케빈오, born August 29, 1990), is a Korean-American singer-songwriter. He is the winner of Superstar K7. He released his first EP, Stardust, on January 20, 2017. He was also a contestant on the JTBC show, Superband.

Personal life 
In April 2022, Kevin and actress Gong Hyo-jin admitted that they were dating. Later on August 17, 2022, Kevin announced in letters posted on his social media accounts that they are getting married in October in the United States, and will be held privately with only close relatives from both families. They married in a private ceremony on October 11, 2022 (US time) in New York City.

Discography

Extended plays

Singles

Soundtrack appearances

References

External links

1990 births
Living people
People from Long Island
21st-century South Korean male singers
Superstar K winners
Dartmouth College alumni
Baptists from New York (state)
American musicians of Korean descent
American expatriates in South Korea
American expatriate musicians